The Zealand Air Defence Regiment was a Danish Army Air defence regiment. On 1 September 1970 it was merged into Kronens Artilleriregiment.

History
The regiment was established on 1 November 1932 as Luftværnsregimentet, however, the regiment traces its history even further back, as it is heir to the old Kystartilleriregimentet. The coast fortifications were transferred to the Navy and the coast artillery regiment was disbanded in 1932. Some of the personal was transferred to 10. Artilleriafdeling (AA) which was turned into an air defense unit. 10.AA was previously a reserved AA in 1. Feltartilleriregiment (Kronens Artilleriregiment). 10. AA formed the core of the new Luftværnsregimentet of 1937, along with 13. AA and 14. AA

On the 3rd of November 1951 14. AA was separeret from the regiment to created Jutlandic Air Defence Regiment.

On 2 July 1962 10th AA was Transferred to The Royal Danish Air Force

Structure
  1st Air Defence Battalion, (1951-1970)
  10th Air Defence Battalion, (1937-1962) Transferred to The Royal Danish Air Force
  13th Air Defence Battalion, (1937-1970)
  14th Air Defence Battalion, (1937-1951) Transferred to Jutlandic Air Defence Regiment

Names of the regiment

References

External Links and Further Reading 
 https://dis-danmark.dk/bibliotek/903108.pdf
 Lærebog for Hærens Menige, Hærkommandoen, marts 1960

Danish Army regiments
Military units and formations established in 1937
Military of Denmark